KORD-FM (102.7 FM) is a radio station broadcasting a country music format. Licensed to Richland, Washington, United States, the station serves the Tri-Cities area. The station is currently owned by Townsquare Media and features programming from Jones Radio Network. The transmitter is located on Jump Off Joe.

History
The station went on the air in 1965. On October 11, 1989, the station changed its call sign from KZZK, using the on-air moniker KZ103 to the current KORD.

As KZZK 102.7, this station operated a CHR/AC leaning format in the 1980s. Towards the end of that decade, it ceded the CHR market to then-powerhouse KIOK (OK95) and became a country music station.

References

External links
Official Website
Flash Stream, AAC Stream

ORD-FM
Townsquare Media radio stations